The North Rockland Central School District is a public school district that serves northern Rockland County, New York, as well as a part of Orange County. It consists of about 7,000 students in 8 schools in grades K–12. The current district Superintendent is Kris F. Felicello.

In Rockland County the district includes all of Stony Point and Haverstraw. The district includes the villages of Haverstraw and West Haverstraw, and the hamlets of Stony Point and Thiells. The district also includes most of Mount Ivy hamlet and a portion of Pomona village. In Orange County the district includes parts of the towns of Highlands, Tuxedo, and Woodbury.

Schools

Elementary
 Stony Point Elementary School
 Thiells Elementary School
 West Haverstraw Elementary School

Intermediate 
 James A. Farley Elementary School
 Willow Grove Elementary School
 Haverstraw Elementary School

Former
 Gerald F. Neary Elementary School
 North Garnerville Elementary School
 Rockland Learning Center

Middle school
 Fieldstone Middle School (Fieldstone Secondary School from 2004-2012)

Senior high
 North Rockland High School

References

External links
 
School districts in New York (state)
Education in Rockland County, New York